Willie David Parker (born March 12, 1945) is a former American football defensive tackle who played four seasons with the Houston Oilers of the National Football League (NFL). He was drafted by the Oilers in the fifth round of the 1967 NFL Draft. Parker played college football at the University of Arkansas at Pine Bluff and attended Morehouse High School in Bastrop, Louisiana. He was also a member of the Houston Texans/Shreveport Steamer of the World Football League.

References

External links
Just Sports Stats

Living people
1945 births
Players of American football from Louisiana
American football defensive tackles
African-American players of American football
Arkansas–Pine Bluff Golden Lions football players
Houston Oilers players
Houston Texans (WFL) players
Shreveport Steamer players
People from Bastrop, Louisiana
21st-century African-American people
20th-century African-American sportspeople